Dicranopygium tatica is a plant belonging to the family Cyclanthaceae. This is a local species, found (often on cliffs) near the Caribbean coast of Costa Rica. It can easily be distinguished from its congeners by having a very short stem with petioles up to 57 cm long terminating in long (up to 53 cm) very narrow, deeply bifid leaves.

References

Cyclanthaceae
Plants described in 2003
Flora of Costa Rica